The 1994–95 NCAA Division III men's ice hockey season began in October 1994 and concluded on March 25 of the following year. This was the 22nd season of Division III college ice hockey.

Regular season

Season tournaments

Standings

Note: Mini-game are not included in final standings

1995 NCAA Tournament

Note: * denotes overtime period(s)

See also
 1994–95 NCAA Division I men's ice hockey season
 1994–95 NCAA Division II men's ice hockey season

References

External links

 
NCAA